Paul Koulouriotis (born 21 February 1982) is a former Australian rules footballer.  who played one season for Port Adelaide in 2000, before playing three seasons for Geelong from 2004–2006 in the AFL.
 
Koulouriotis attended St Mary's secondary school, now Simonds Catholic College, in West Melbourne before transferring to St Joseph's College, Melbourne to complete his VCE in 1999.

External links
 

1982 births
Living people
Australian rules footballers from Victoria (Australia)
Port Adelaide Football Club players
Port Adelaide Football Club players (all competitions)
Geelong Football Club players
Australian people of Greek descent
Calder Cannons players
People educated at St Joseph's College, Melbourne